The 1967 Central Michigan Chippewas football team represented Central Michigan University in the Interstate Intercollegiate Athletic Conference (IIAC) during the 1967 NCAA College Division football season.  In their first season under head coach Roy Kramer, the Chippewas compiled an 8–2 record (2–1 against IIAC opponents), tied for the IIAC championship, held five of their ten opponents to fewer than seven points, and outscored all opponents by a combined total of 207 to 84.

The team's statistical leaders included quarterback Gene Gilin with 611 passing yards, tailback Craig Tefft with 1,046 rushing yards, and end Greg Hoefler with 292 receiving yards.  Fullback Wally Hempton received the team's most valuable player award.  Ten Central Michigan players (Tefft, Hoefler, Hempton, backs Chuck Barker and Bruce Cameron, defensive ends Bucky Colton and Mark Maksimovicz, guard Al McNeal, and tackles Ralph Sarnowski and Raleigh Smith) received first-team honors on the All-IIAC team.

Bill Kelly retired as Central Michigan's head football coach at the end of the 1966 season after 16 years in the position. Roy Kramer, who had served as Central's freshman football coach in 1966, was hired to replace him.

Schedule

References

Central Michigan
Central Michigan Chippewas football seasons
Interstate Intercollegiate Athletic Conference football champion seasons
Central Michigan Chippewas football